Kill at Will (titled At Will in its censored version) is an extended play by American rapper Ice Cube, released in 1990 via Priority Records. It was released soon after AmeriKKKa's Most Wanted and capitalized on Cube's newfound solo success.

The last track, "I Gotta Say What Up!!!", contains a diss directed toward N.W.A in response to the group dissing Ice Cube on their 1990 EP 100 Miles and Runnin'.

Critical reception
Trouser Press praised "the lighthearted 'Jackin’ for Beats' (which bites EPMD, PE, Digital Underground, LL Cool J and others) and the devastating 'Dead Homiez', in which [Cube] solemnly contemplates the murder of a friend over an evocative mix of horn, guitar and piano."

Track listing

Partial list of samples

"Endangered Species (Tales from the Darkside) (Remix)"
 "The Payback" by James Brown
 "Funky Drummer" by James Brown
 "Standin' on the Verge of Gettin' It On" by Funkadelic
 "Bop Gun (Endangered Species)" by Parliament
 "Straight Outta Compton (Extended Mix)" by N.W.A
 "Bring the Noise" by Public Enemy

"The Product"
 "Good Times" by Kool and the Gang
 "Rated X" by Kool and the Gang
 "Jungle Boogie" by Kool and the Gang
 "You Can Make It If You Try" by Sly & the Family Stone
 "Train Sequence", narrated by Geoffrey Sumner
 "Funky Drummer" by James Brown
 "The Nigga Ya Love to Hate" by Ice Cube
 "Illegal Search" by LL Cool J

"I Gotta Say What Up!!!"
 "Hyperbolicsyllabicsesquedalymistic" by Isaac Hayes
 "Synthetic Substitution" by Melvin Bliss
 "Who Stole the Soul?" by Public Enemy

"Dead Homiez"
 "Rollin' Wit the Lench Mob" by Ice Cube
 "Do Like I Do" by Smokey Robinson

"Jackin' for Beats"
 "It's a Man's Man's Man's World" by James Brown
 "The Payback" by James Brown
 "Funky President" by James Brown
 "Funky Drummer" by James Brown
 "I Know You Got Soul" by Bobby Byrd
 "Hot Pants - I'm Coming, I'm Coming, I'm Coming" by Bobby Byrd
 "Bop Gun (Endangered Species)" by Parliament
 "Sing a Simple Song" by Sly & the Family Stone
 "Big Ole Butt" by LL Cool J
 "So Wat Cha Sayin'" by EPMD
 "Heed the Word of the Brother" by X-Clan
 "They Call Me D-Nice" by D-Nice
 "Ashley's Roachclip" by The Soul Searchers
 "Bon Bon Vie" by T.S. Monk
 "Tramp" by Lowell Fulsom
 "Psychedelic Shack" by The Temptations
 "Hector" by Village Callers
 "The Big Beat" by Billy Squier
 "The Haunted House", narrated by Laura Olsher
 "Welcome to the Terrordome" by Public Enemy
 "The Humpty Dance" by Digital Underground
 "Rebel Without a Pause" by Public Enemy
 "100 Miles and Runnin" by N.W.A

Later samples
 "Dead Homiez"
 "Young Black Male" by 2Pac from the album 2Pacalypse Now
 "The Product"
 "Young Black Male" by 2Pac from the album 2Pacalypse Now

Album singles
"Endangered Species (Tales from the Darkside)"
 Released: 1990
 B-side: "Dead Homiez"

Charts

Weekly charts

Year-end charts

Certifications

References

1990 EPs
Ice Cube albums
Priority Records EPs